Rolf Lacour (26 June 1937 – 28 January 2018) was a German wrestler who competed in the 1964 Summer Olympics, in the 1968 Summer Olympics, and in the 1972 Summer Olympics.

References

External links
 

1937 births
2018 deaths
Olympic wrestlers of the United Team of Germany
Olympic wrestlers of West Germany
Wrestlers at the 1964 Summer Olympics
Wrestlers at the 1968 Summer Olympics
Wrestlers at the 1972 Summer Olympics
German male sport wrestlers
Sportspeople from Saarbrücken